"El ritmo del Chino" ("The rhythm of the Chinaman"), sometimes call "El baile del Chino" is a technocumbia song created for the political campaign of the 2000 elections of the Peruvian president and candidate for re-election Alberto Fujimori, who is affectionately nicknamed El Chino ("the Chinaman") as he is of Asian (Japanese) descent.

Description 
The song was created by journalist  and Carlos Raffo, director of the fujimorism campaign, and is interpreted by Ana Kohler, who at that time was one of the most representative exponents of the technocumbia genre, very in vogue in Peru at the end of the 1990s. According to a report in Caretas magazine, the song would be written by Eder Santiago or Kevin Borda.

With a catchy rhythm and simple lyrics, with the chorus of Chino, Chino, Chino, Chino, Chino, the music video of the song, used during the second round, presents images of some rallies of the ruling party Peru 2000 enlivened by Kohler and his dancers. The political involvement in which Kohler was involved, after the Fujimori corruption scandals investigated after the resignation, capture and trial of Fujimori, caused his musical career to end and he migrated with his family to the United States in 2003.

The song served as the musical background for the popular presentations of the candidate Fujimori, who appeared with her daughter Keiko Fujimori, dancing on stage. "El ritmo del Chino" inaugurated a new populist way of electoral campaign, preferring fashionable music to political messages and proposals.

In 2018, after the presidential pardon of Fujimori by Pedro Pablo Kuczynski, a new version of the song was viralized on social networks.

References

Citations

Sources cited 

 

2000 songs
Spanish-language songs
Political party songs
Fujimorism